The Uskmouth power stations (also known as the Fifoots Point power stations) refers to a series of two coal-fired power stations at the mouth of the River Usk in the south-east of Newport, Wales. The first of the two station, Uskmouth A power station, was built in the 1940s and demolished in 2002.

The second station, Uskmouth B power station, was built in the 1950s and is currently undergoing a conversion to run on biomass and waste plastic.

Uskmouth A
Uskmouth A power station was authorised in 1947, and building started in April 1948. The first generating set was commissioned in December 1952,  followed by other sets in September 1953, March 1954, September 1954, June 1956 and finally December 1956 for a set scrapped in January 1956. It comprised four Fraser and Chalmers / GEC 60 MW hydrogen cooled 11.8 kV turbo-alternators, these were supplied with steam at 62.1 bar and 482 °C. The 12 Babcock and Wilcox pulverised fuel boilers were capable of delivering 320.0 kg/s of steam.

The generating capacity and output of the station was as follows.

The steam turbine suffered a catastrophic overspeed event in 1958 killing two workers and throwing parts of the turbine into the adjacent river.

The A station was closed on 26 October 1981 with a generating capacity of 228 megawatts. The station was demolished in 2002

Uskmouth B
Uskmouth B power station (or Uskmouth Power as it is now known) was authorised in May 1957 and built in 1959. It has a generating capacity of 363 MW, which is enough to power 360,000 homes, or the surrounding area of Newport. The electricity is provided by three 110 MW generating sets. Uskmouth B was one of the CEGB’s twenty steam power stations with the highest thermal efficiency at the time; in 1963–4 the thermal efficiency was 32.15 per cent, 32.72 per cent in 1964–5, and 32.89 per cent in 1965–6. The pulverised fuel boilers were capable of delivering 324.0 kg/s of steam at 103.4 bar and 538 °C. It is situated in an essential position for the National Grid, as there are very few power stations situated in the south of Wales. The annual electricity output of Uskmouth B was:

Initially operated by the Central Electricity Generating Board, the station's operations were handed over to National Power with privatisation in 1990. The station was then closed in 1995. But in 1998, it was purchased by AES. The station was given a £120 million refurbishment to bring it up to date with legislative requirements. New environmental equipment was installed and it was given a refurbishment which is thought to have extended the station's life by 25 years. The station's generating capacity was also increased to 393 MW. In 2001 the work was completed and the station was reopened. However, only a year later the plant passed into receivership, but had a brief period of operating in the winter between 2003 and 2004. In June 2004 the station was put back into full operation, when it was bought by Welsh Power, who were then known as Carron Energy. Welsh Power sold it to SSE (Scottish and Southern Energy plc) in 2009 for £27m. In April 2013 one of the three remaining blocks was closed, so the power station has now a remaining generation capacity of 260 MW.

The station was one of the cleanest coal-fired power stations in the United Kingdom, and was fitted with Flue Gas Desulphurisation equipment and low NOx burners. It also burns biomass, as well as coal, for its emissions to be considered closer to being carbon neutral. The station does not take water from or dump waste water into the River Usk. It instead uses secondary treated sewage water in its cooling system.

The station employed 90 people. It has been awarded RoSPA Gold Award for Occupational Health and Safety for its efforts to ensure station safety. The station's owners have participated in many local community projects – they donated land to the Newport Wetlands Reserve, and sponsor Welsh swimmer David Davies and the Newport Gwent Dragons.

The station was earmarked for closure in 2014 and subsequently mothballed. However, in 2015, plans were announced to instead convert the station to run fully on pellets of biomass and waste plastic, as part of a scheme to regenerate the area and create hundreds of jobs. These plans have since taken priority and as a result, Uskmouth has seen very infrequent use as a coal plant; with April 2017 being the last occasion.

In 2017, Atlantis Energy joined a partnership to undertake this transformation by 2020. In 2019, it was reported that the plant would be running on 50% pellets of plastic and 50% pellets of cardboard and paper by 2021 and is expected to operate for 20 years. As of 2022, the B station is being dismantled.

Severn Power Station
An 832 megawatt (MW) Combined Cycle Power Plant running on natural gas, known as Severn Power Station, was built on the site of Uskmouth A by Siemens. It comprises two gas turbines and two steam turbines, each operating on a single shaft, and entered commercial operations in November 2010. It was initially reported that it would cost £400 million to build and create 650 construction jobs.

Originally owned and operated by the Danish company DONG Energy (now Ørsted), the station was acquired in December 2013 by MPF Holdings, which later changed its name to Calon Energy.

Uses in culture
In 2006, the station was used as a location for two episodes of Doctor Who. In the episodes "Rise of the Cybermen" and "The Age of Steel", the station was used as the setting for the Cybermen Factory. It was then used again for the 2011 Christmas special "The Doctor, the Widow and the Wardrobe" as spaceship corridors, filmed on 20 September 2011. In 2014, the station was once again used for two episodes, respectively "Into the Dalek" and "Time Heist".

References

Buildings and structures in Newport, Wales
Landmarks in Newport, Wales
Coal-fired power stations in Wales
Demolished buildings and structures in Wales
Buildings and structures demolished in 2002